Matías Nicolás Tagliamonte (born 19 February 1998) is an Argentine professional footballer who plays as a goalkeeper for Racing Club.

Club career
Tagliamonte came through the youth ranks at local team Atlético de Rafaela. He was initially called up to the first-team in June 2017 and was an unused substitute for a Copa Argentina win over Almagro on 7 June and on 25 June in the Primera División against Sarmiento; which came on the final day of the 2016–17 campaign, as both sides were relegated. He was an unused sub twenty more times across the next three seasons in league and cup. Tagliamonte made his senior debut on 7 October 2019 during a 1–1 draw away to Santamarina, which preceded further appearances versus Instituto and San Martín later that month.

After no more matches for Atlético de Rafaela over the next sixteen months, partly due to a shoulder injury, Tagliamonte departed on loan in February 2021 to Primera División side Racing Club until the end of the year with a purchase option. With Gabriel Arias and Gastón Gómez unavailable after testing positive for COVID-19, Tagliamonte made his debut for Racing on 17 March during a Copa Argentina round of sixty-four victory over third tier team Sportivo Belgrano. Racing made use of the purchase option at the end of the year.

International career
In 2015, Tagliamonte was selected on the preliminary squad list for the South American U-17 Championship in Paraguay; though didn't make the final cut.

Career statistics
.

Notes

References

External links

1998 births
Living people
People from Rafaela
Argentine people of Italian descent
Argentine footballers
Association football goalkeepers
Primera Nacional players
Atlético de Rafaela footballers
Racing Club de Avellaneda footballers
Sportspeople from Santa Fe Province